Bellvís is a village in the province of Lleida and autonomous community of Catalonia. The municipality has an exclave to the north-east, Remolins, among other minor settlements, some of which are now uninhabited.

Population centres
Bellvís, with 2.134 inhabitants
Els Arcs, with 160 inhabitants 
Other minor settlements include Remolins, Les Tarroges, Safareig, Gatén, La Quadra d’Arrufat, El Saladar, Gaveta, Les Planes, El Negral, L’Erol and El Comú.

References

External links 

 Government data pages 
 Patrimoni històric i artístic de Bellvís

Municipalities in Pla d'Urgell
Populated places in Pla d'Urgell